Thomas Samuel Bennett (April 1891 – 11 January 1923) was an English footballer who played as a striker. He played league football for Liverpool and Rochdale.

Bennett was a prolific goal scorer for Liverpool and South Liverpool during World War One, but he only made four league appearances and one F.A. Cup appearance (with one goal) throughout his career.

Bennett died on 11 January 1923 from tuberculosis, aged 31.

Career Statistics

References

1891 births
1923 deaths
English footballers
Footballers from Liverpool
Liverpool F.C. players
Rochdale A.F.C. players
Everton F.C. players
South Liverpool F.C. (1890s) players
Northwich Victoria F.C. players
Wigan Borough F.C. players
Halifax Town A.F.C. players
Association football forwards
20th-century deaths from tuberculosis
Tuberculosis deaths in England